Juan Alberto Larrea (born 15 July 1993) is an Argentine professional footballer who plays as a defensive midfielder for Greek Super League 2 club Panachaiki.

Career
Ferro Carril Oeste were Larrea's first club. After being an unused substitute once during the 2011–12 Primera B Nacional season, Larrea made his debut for the club on 1 September 2012 during a draw away to Independiente Rivadavia. He made fourteen appearances in 2012–13 as they placed seventeenth, prior to featuring five times in 2013–14. In July 2014, Larrea was loaned to Primera B Metropolitana's Comunicaciones. He returned on 31 December, though never made an appearance for Comunicaciones. Larrea then participated in seventeen matches in two campaigns for Ferro, before joining Cañuelas.

Two goals in thirty-two fixtures followed in Primera C Metropolitana for Cañuelas, as they were eliminated from the promotion play-offs by Deportivo Merlo. Primera B Nacional side Quilmes completed the signing of Larrea on 21 July 2017. His first appearance arrived against Sarmiento on 18 September, with his first goal following in February 2018 versus Brown. July 2019 saw Larrea depart for Greece to join Apollon Smyrnis of Super League 2. He made his debut on 29 September versus Ergotelis, which was the first of sixteen appearances; he also scored two goals, against Apollon Pontou and Karaiskakis.

On 24 August 2020, Larrea moved across the Greek second tier to Panachaiki.

Career statistics
.

References

External links

1993 births
Living people
Sportspeople from Lanús
Argentine footballers
Association football midfielders
Argentine expatriate footballers
Expatriate footballers in Greece
Argentine expatriate sportspeople in Greece
Primera Nacional players
Primera C Metropolitana players
Super League Greece 2 players
Ferro Carril Oeste footballers
Club Comunicaciones footballers
Cañuelas footballers
Quilmes Atlético Club footballers
Apollon Smyrnis F.C. players
Panachaiki F.C. players